Grigore Anghel (born 7 May 1960) is a Romanian bobsledder. He competed in the two man and the four man events at the 1988 Winter Olympics.

References

External links

1960 births
Living people
Romanian male bobsledders
Olympic bobsledders of Romania
Bobsledders at the 1988 Winter Olympics
Place of birth missing (living people)